Milan Savić (born 4 April 1994) is a Serbian professional footballer who plays as a defender for Radnički Niš.

Club career
On 24 September 2021, he joined Radnički Niš.

References

External links
 
 Milan Savić stats at utakmica.rs 
 

1994 births
Living people
Footballers from Belgrade
Association football defenders
Serbian footballers
Serbia youth international footballers
K.A.A. Gent players
OFK Beograd players
FK Novi Pazar players
Anorthosis Famagusta F.C. players
Balzan F.C. players
FK RFS players
FK Zemun players
NK Inter Zaprešić players
FK Radnički Niš players
Belgian Pro League players
Serbian SuperLiga players
Cypriot First Division players
Maltese Premier League players
Latvian Higher League players
Croatian Football League players
Serbian expatriate footballers
Serbian expatriate sportspeople in Belgium
Serbian expatriate sportspeople in Croatia
Serbian expatriate sportspeople in Cyprus
Expatriate footballers in Cyprus
Expatriate footballers in Belgium
Expatriate footballers in Croatia